Helgelands Blad is a local online and print newspaper published in Sandnessjøen, Norway. It covers the municipality of Alstahaug and vicinity in outer Helgeland. Published in tabloid format, the newspaper had a circulation of 4,793 in 2013. The newspaper is independently owned. It has three weekly issues, on Mondays, Wednesdays and Fridays. The newspaper was founded in 1904.

References

Newspapers published in Norway
Alstahaug
Mass media in Nordland
Companies based in Nordland
Publications established in 1904
1904 establishments in Norway